Slobodan "Boban" Janković (December 15, 1963 – June 28, 2006) was a Serbian professional basketball player. His son, Vlado Janković, is also a professional basketball player.

Early life
At the age of 7, Janković moved to Belgrade.

Professional basketball career
Janković (nicknamed Bomber) joined his first professional basketball club, Crvena zvezda of the Yugoslavian Basketball League in 1980, still short of his 17th birthday. Over the next 10 seasons, he grew into a dependable 6'7½" (2.02 m) tall small forward. In 1990, he transferred to the Yugoslavian Basketball League club Vojvodina of Novi Sad, but he stayed there for only one season.

Panionios accident
In 1992, the head coach of Panionios, Vlade Đurović, Janković's mentor from his Red Star days, was instrumental in bringing him to the Greek Basketball League club. During the 1992–93 season, the 29-year-old Janković enjoyed a good run of playing form and success with Panionios. On April 28, 1993, Janković injured himself during a Greek League playoff game between Panionios and Panathinaikos in Nea Smyrni, Athens, Greece, on the home court of Panionios.

The injury occurred eight minutes before the end of a tense playoff match. Janković thought he scored a basket on a drive to the hoop while being guarded by Panathinaikos player Fragiskos Alvertis. However, the referee Stelios Koukoulekidis, called an offensive foul on him. It was Janković's fifth foul of the game, which meant that he had fouled out.

In reaction to what he believed was a bad call at a crucial moment of a very important playoff game, Janković slammed his head hard against the padded concrete goal post. He permanently damaged his spinal cord and was unable to walk for the rest of his life.

Janković made an emotional return to Panionios in October 1993 when he attended a Greek Basket League game against Olympiakos at which the Panionios supporters repeatedly chanted his name and the wave of emotion carried Panionios to the 83–72 win. Janković was in tears as he was wheeled onto court to receive the acclaim of the stadium.

Panionios retired his number 8 jersey.

Death
After using a wheelchair for the final 13 years of his life, Janković gained weight, which exerted much stress on his heart. He died of heart failure at the age of 42, on June 28, 2006, while on a holiday cruise on the Greek island of Rhodes.

See also 
 KK Crvena zvezda accomplishments and records
 List of KK Crvena zvezda players with 100 games played
 List of Yugoslav First Federal Basketball League annual scoring leaders

References

External links
FIBA Europe Profile
GalanisSportsData.com Bio
ACB.com Article 

1963 births
2006 deaths
KK Crvena zvezda players
KK Vojvodina players
People from Lučani
Panionios B.C. players
Serbian men's basketball players
Serbian expatriate basketball people in Greece
Small forwards
Yugoslav men's basketball players